Melody of a Great City (German: Großstadtmelodie) is a 1943 musical drama film directed by Wolfgang Liebeneiner and starring Hilde Krahl, Werner Hinz and Karl John. A young woman moves to Berlin to work as a press photographer.

Cast

Hilde Krahl as Renate Heiberg  
Werner Hinz as Dr. Rolf Bergmann, Berichterstatter  
Karl John as Klaus Nolte  
Paul Henckels as Direktor Heinze, Verlagsleiter 
Will Dohm as Dr. Pauske, Bildredakteur vom Dienst  
Curt Ackermann as Der Direktor der Revue  
Günther Ballier as Ein Berliner an der Strassenbahnhaltestelle  
Heinz Baur as Velten, Mitarbeiter Dr. Werners  
Fritz Berghof as Eine unnahbare ausländische Persönlichkeit  
Elfie Beyer as Vroni Huber, Renates Cousine 
Erwin Biegel as Der Intendant der Revue  
Marlies Bieneck as Lotti Brandt, Dr. Pauskes Sekretärin  
Käte Bierkowsky as Frau Stirner  
Beppo Brem as Geldbriefträger 
Heinz Brilloff as Ein Reporter, der im See baden geht 
Vera Complojer as Frau Moosbrugger  
Gerhard Dammann as Der Lastwagenfahrer  
Ernst Dernburg as Herr Stirner  
Franz Dombrowski as Der Verkehrsschutzmann am Potsdamer Platz  
Liesl Eckardt as Dienstmädchen bei Dr. Pauske  
Josef Eichheim as Alois Huber, Fotograf  
Peter Elsholtz as Buckel, Mitarbeiter Dr. Werners  
Angelo Ferrari as Ein ausländischer Berichterstatter bei der Revue - Probe  
Otto Graf as Dr. Werner, Chefredakteur  
Walter Gross as Ein Berliner an der Strassenbahnhaltestelle  
Wilhelm Große as Der Standesbeamte, der Klaus und Viola traut  
Clemens Hasse as Tielke, Fotolaborant  
Johannes Heesters as Spielt sich selbst in einer Revue  
Friedel Heizmann as Die Schriftleiterin, die Bilder aus Stuttgart sucht  
Irmgard Hoffmann as Frau Tupfer  
Melanie Horeschowsky as Frau Krauthofer, Berliner Pensionsinhaberin  
Ursula Klinder as Frl. Kindler 
 as Der Berliner Bildreporterkollege von Klaus  
Marlise Ludwig as Frau Pauske  
Käte Merk as Eine junge Dame am nächtlichen Würstchenstand  
Kurt Mikulski as Ein Berliner an der Strassenbahnhaltestelle  
Karl Morvilius as Ein Polizeiwachtmeister beim nächtlichen Rundgang  
Peter Mosbacher as Kajetan Orff  
Ditta Oesch as Anni, das Mädchen bei Alois Huber  
Walter Pentzlin as Ein Herr  
Wolfram Pokorny as Ein Reporter, der im See baden geht  
Gustav Püttjer as Ein Schweißarbeiter im nächtlichen Berlin  
Karl Rathgeb as Kiebitz  
Paul Rehkopf as Der alte Flickschuster in Berlin  
Willi Rose as Der Polizist im Tiergarten  
Günter Sabek as Florian, Söhnchen von Frau Tupfer  
Werner Schott as Herr Petersen 
Heinrich Schroth as Alter Herr mit Enkelkind  
Vera Schulz as Das Zimmermädchen der Pension 
Walter Steinweg as Ein Reporter, der im See baden geht 
Ernst Stimmel as Herr Albrecht  
Werner Stock as Heinzelmann, Mitarbeiter Dr. Werners 
Otto Stoeckel as Dr. Springer, Direktor einer Bildagentur  
Gerda Maria Terno as Mutter mit Kind  
Konrad Thoms as Ein Bildreporter bei der Revueprobe  
Rudolf Günther Wagner as Ein Bildreporter bei der Revueprobe  
Franz Weber as Der Direktor einer Fotoagentur  
Inge Weigand as Frl. Gerti von der Berolina-Press  
Hilde Weissner as Frau Hesse, Besitzerin eines Modesalons 
Eduard Wenck as Botenmeister, Portier der Berolina-Press  
Charlotte Witthauer as Eine Telefonistin im Flughafenhotel  
Viola Zarell as Viola, Tänzerin und Revuestar, Verlobte von Klaus Nolte  
Maria Zidek as Die Sekretärin bei Bergmann  
Manon Chafour 
Rolf Jahncke
Friedrich Maurer
Otto Mownstaedt
Erik Radolf
Just Scheu
Greta Schröder
Ewald Wenck
Bernhard Wosien

References

External links

Melody of a Great City AKA Grossstadtmelodie Full movie with English subtitles at Deutsche Filmothek

1943 films
Films of Nazi Germany
German musical drama films
1940s musical drama films
Films set in Berlin
Films directed by Wolfgang Liebeneiner
Films about photographers
German black-and-white films
1943 drama films
1940s German-language films